Kostas Papageorgiou (born 1 January 1941) is a Greek former professional footballer who played as striker.

Club career
Papageorgiou started his football career in 1956, at the age of 15, when following the footsteps of his father, he enrolled in the infrastructure departments of Panathinaikos. He immediately attracted the attention and interest of the then coach, Svetislav Glišović, who recognized his talent at a sight. As a member of the reserve teams of the "greens" he performed excellently, playing as striker and scoring massively. After the first year of staying in the 3rd team, he was promoted for the next two years to the 2nd team and under János Zsolnai, he was promoted to the first team. He competed in three friendly matches against Wiener, Fostiras and Egaleo, leaving excellent impressions with his performances. However, the management of the club sidelined Papageorgiou, without giving him further opportunities to participate in matches. At the time, the 18-year-old forward was working in the morning hours and attending classes in the last class of the night eight-class then Gymnasium. In July 1959, disappointed by the treatment he received from Panathinaikos, he left the "greens" and joined Atromitos, who were competing in the Athens FCA Championship at the time and immediately after in the newly formed second division. His appearances with the club from Peristeri attracted the interest of AEK Athens, who signed him up in the summer of 1963, for 200,000 drachmas.

With the yellow-blacks he had an active participation, but the competition for a place in the team's offense was very tough. On 1 March 1964 he scored a hat-trick in the 4–0 home win against Olympiacos Chalkida. On 4 April 1965 he scored all four goals of his team, in a 4–0 win against Athninaikos at home. Three days later, he scored at the derby against Olympiacos, where AEK won by 1–2 with a comeback, at Karaiskakis Stadium. On 13 June 1965 he scored 4 of the 5 goals in the 5–0 home win against Niki Volos. He scored a brace in a dramatic 3–3 draw against Olympiacos in Nea Filadelfeia. On 30 January 1966 he scored the winner in the final minutes in an away win against Egaleo. He scored the winner against FK Vardar at home for the Balkans Cup on 19 April 1967, in a season that they went udefeated, losing only in the final by Fenerbahçe. On 14 July 1968 he scored the only goal of his team shaping the final 2–1 away from home against Olympiacos, for the semi-finals of the Cup. On 18 September 1968 he scored his only goal for the UEFA competitions in a 3–0 home win against Jeunesse Esch, contributing to the club's course to the quarter-finals of the European Cup. With AEK he won the Championship of 1968, as well as two Cups. The limited number of permitted substitutions at that time and the presence of star players in the then yellow–black offensive line did not allow him to make more participations. In 1969 as a part of renewall of Branko Stanković in the club's roster, he left AEK, a departure for which he has repeatedly expressed his displeasure.

He signed at the neighboring Apollon Athens, where he competed in the second division and won it at the end of the season, creating a record for the division, by scoring 41 league goals in a season. He played at the club until 1974, when he retired at the age of 33.

Personal life
On 4 September 2021 Papageorgiou donated the jersey he wore on 20 June 1968 in the match against Iraklis, in the last match of Jenő Csaknády at the bench of AEK Athens, to the then under-construction History museum of AEK Athens in the Agia Sophia Stadium. He visited the museum with his son, Giannis and wore the same jersey again.

Honours

Atomitos
Athens FCA Championship: 1961–62

AEK Athens
Alpha Ethniki: 1967–68
Greek Cup: 1963–64, 1965–66

Apollon Athens
Beta Ethniki: 1969–70, 1972–73

Individual
Beta Ethniki top scorer: 1969–70

References

1941 births
Living people
Super League Greece players
Panathinaikos F.C. players
Atromitos F.C. players
AEK Athens F.C. players
Apollon Smyrnis F.C. players
Association football forwards
Footballers from Athens
Greek footballers